Chrysomela is a genus of leaf beetles found almost throughout the world, but not in Australia. It contains around 40 species, including 7 in eastern and northern Europe. It also includes at least 17 species in North America, including the cottonwood leaf beetle Chrysomela scripta.

Taxonomy
Chrysomela is traditionally broken up into three subgenera, Chrysomela, Macrolina (or Strickerus) and Pachylina. In 1998, researchers Maurizio Biondi and Mauro Daccordi proposed a new classification of Chryomela without any subgenera. This was followed by the sixth volume of the Catalogue of Palaearctic Coleoptera.

Species
These 28 species belong to the genus Chrysomela:

 Chrysomela aeneicollis (Schaeffer, 1928) i c g b
 Chrysomela collaris Linnaeus, 1758 g
 Chrysomela collaris alpina Zetterstedt, 1838
 Chrysomela collaris blaisdelli (Van Dyke, 1938)
 Chrysomela collaris collaris Linnaeus, 1758
 Chrysomela collaris hyperborea Medvedev & Khruleva, 2011
 Chrysomela confluens Rogers, 1856 i c g b
 Chrysomela crotchi Brown, 1956 i c g b (aspen leaf beetle)
 Chrysomela cuprea Fabricius, 1775 g
 Chrysomela cyaneoviridis Gruev, 1994
 Chrysomela falsa Brown, 1956 i c g b
 Chrysomela flavicornis Suffrian, 1851 g
 Chrysomela interrupta Fabricius, 1801 i c g b (alder leaf beetle)
 Chrysomela invicta Brown, 1956 i c g
 Chrysomela knabi Brown, 1956 i c g b
 Chrysomela lapponica Linnaeus, 1758 g
 Chrysomela laurentia Brown, 1956 i c g b
 Chrysomela lineatopunctata Forster, 1771 i c g b
 Chrysomela mainensis J. Bechyné, 1954 i c g b
 Chrysomela populi Linnaeus, 1758 g
 Chrysomela saliceti (Weise, 1884) g
 Chrysomela saliceti afghanica (Reineck, 1937)
 Chrysomela saliceti quadricollis (Jakob, 1955)
 Chrysomela saliceti saliceti Weise, 1884)
 Chrysomela saliceti turcestanica (Reineck, 1937)
 Chrysomela salicivorax (Jakob, 1953)
 Chrysomela schaefferi Brown, 1956 i c g b
 Chrysomela scripta Fabricius, 1801 i c g b (cottonwood leaf beetle)
 Chrysomela semota Brown, 1956 i c g b
 Chrysomela sonorae Brown, 1956 i c g b
 Chrysomela taimyrensis Medvedev & Chernov, 1969
 Chrysomela texana (Schaeffer, 1920) i c g b (red-headed willow leaf beetle)
 Chrysomela tremula Fabricius, 1787 g
 Chrysomela tremula selengensis (Jakob, 1953)
 Chrysomela tremula tremula Fabricius, 1787
 Chrysomela vigintipunctata (Scopoli, 1763) g
 Chrysomela vigintipunctata alticola Wang, 1992
 Chrysomela vigintipunctata vigintipunctata (Scopoli, 1763)
 Chrysomela walshi Brown, 1956 i c g
 Chrysomela wrangeliana Medvedev, 1973

Data sources: i = ITIS, c = Catalogue of Life, g = GBIF, b = Bugguide.net

References

External links
 
 
 Chrysomela scripta on the UF / IFAS Featured Creatures Web site

Chrysomelinae
Taxa named by Carl Linnaeus
Chrysomelidae genera